Alfredo Rizalito "Jojo" P. Alejar (born June 19, 1966) is a Filipino TV host, actor-comedian, best known as the founding member of the dance group The Tigers and as the host and producer of The Medyo Late Night Show with Jojo A.

Personal life
Alejar was on June 19, 1966 in Manila. He is the younger brother of actor Toby Alejar and 5th of 6 brothers.

Alejar is married to Anna Guia Villapando Reyes from Sta. Maria, Bulacan and has four children: Alfredo Alexander ("Tra"), Aurora Leticia ("Al"), Alfredo Emmanuel ("Aeman") and Ava Marie ("Ava").

Filmography

Television

Discography
 Jojo Alejar (Noisy Records, 1986)
 Ngumangawang Pag-Ibig (as "Master J") (Alpha Records, 2001)

Awards and nominations

References

External links

http://aczafra.com/2006/01/24/jojo-a-all-the-way/

1966 births
Living people
That's Entertainment (Philippine TV series)
That's Entertainment Wednesday Group Members
People from Quezon City
Male actors from Metro Manila
Filipino television talk show hosts
GMA Network personalities
ABS-CBN personalities
TV5 (Philippine TV network) personalities